One Night in America is the twenty first studio album by American blues singer and harmonica player Charlie Musselwhite. It was released in February 2002 on Telarc record label and it was Musselwhite's debut and only release on this label.

Track listing
"Trail of Tears" (Allen Reynolds, Roger Cook) – 4:17 	
"Cold Grey Light of Dawn" (Ivory Joe Hunter) – 2:55 	
"Blues Overtook Me" (Musselwhite) – 4:26 	
"In a Town This Size" (Kieran Kane) – 3:38 	
"Walking Alone" (Pontus Snibb) – 4:45 	
"Rank Strangers to Me" (Albert E. Brumley) – 4:34 	
"One Time One Night" (David Hidalgo, Louie Pérez) – 4:42 	
"In Your Darkest Hour" (Musselwhite) – 4:29 	
"Big River" (John R. Cash) – 5:20 	
"Ain't It Time" (Musselwhite) – 4:18 	
"I'll Meet You Over There" (Musselwhite) – 2:51 	
"Ain't That Lovin' You Baby" (Jimmy Reed) – 2:56

Personnel
Charlie Musselwhite – vocals, harmonica
G. E. Smith – guitar
Robben Ford – guitar
Marty Stuart – guitar, mandolin
T-Bone Wolk – bass
Peter Re – organ
Michael Jerome – drums
Per Hanson – drums
Christine Ohlman – vocals
Kelly Willis – vocals

References

2002 albums
Charlie Musselwhite albums
Telarc International Corporation albums